The Battle of Shawali Kowt took place near the Arghandab River in Afghanistan during the Invasion of Afghanistan. On December 2, 2001, after a pitched street-by-street battle, the Green Berets and Afghan Freedom Fighters captured the town of Shawali Kowt, but could not gain control over a bridge over the Arghandab River, a gateway to the Taliban spiritual center of Kandahar. That night, the Taliban forces launched a major counterattack, triggering a retreat by the Afghans. Over the next eight hours, the American forces defended against the retreat. U.S. Air Force Sergeant Alex Yoshimoto, the combat controller, orchestrated numerous air strikes from a variety of fighters and bombers, thwarting the Taliban charge and forcing the enemy to retreat.

References 

Afghanistan conflict (1978–present)
Conflicts in 2001
Battles of the War in Afghanistan (2001–2021)
Military operations of the War in Afghanistan (2001–2021) involving the United States
Operations involving American special forces
2001 in Afghanistan
History of Urozgan Province
Battles post-1945
December 2001 events in Asia

Battles in 2001